Melrose House in 26 Brougham Street, Nelson, New Zealand, is registered with Heritage New Zealand as a category I structure with registration number 259. It was built for Charles Fowell Willet Watts (1823–1881), one of Nelson's earliest settlers.

References

External links
 Melrose House and Garden

Heritage New Zealand Category 1 historic places in the Nelson Region
Buildings and structures in Nelson, New Zealand
Houses completed in 1881
1880s architecture in New Zealand